"What Love Has Joined Together" is a song written and composed by Miracles members Smokey Robinson and Bobby Rogers,  and was recorded by six Motown acts: Mary Wells, The Temptations, Smokey Robinson & The Miracles, Barbara McNair, Syreeta, and Queen Latifah (after her years at Motown) and was issued as B-sides to hits by Wells and The Temptations; "Your Old Standby" for Wells, released in 1963, and "It's Growing" by The Temptations, released in 1965.

Song information
The song talks about a person professing their love to their loved one regardless of people's comments trying to separate them, with the person stressing the point that "what love has joined together can nobody take it apart". The song was originally recorded by the Miracles in 1962. Wells would record her version a year later while the Temptations covered it for their The Temptations Sing Smokey album in 1965. Barbara McNair recorded her version in 1968 for a proposed album "Barbara McNair Sings Smokey." It remained unreleased until 2004. Syreeta's version appeared on her debut album for Motown's MoWest label which was released in 1972. The Miracles also would record a special extended version of the song in 1970, as the title cut from their album of the same name. (See What Love Has...Joined Together ) . Queen Latifah's version appeared on her 2007 "Trav'lin Light" CD.

Personnel

Mary Wells version
Lead vocals by Mary Wells
Background vocals by the Love Tones
Instrumentation by the Funk Brothers

The Temptations version
Lead vocals by Eddie Kendricks
Background vocals by Paul Williams, David Ruffin, Melvin Franklin and Otis Williams
Instrumentation by the Funk Brothers

Barbara McNair version
Lead vocals by Barbara McNair
Background vocals by the Andantes
Instrumentation by LA musicians

The Miracles version
Lead vocals by Smokey Robinson
Background vocals by Claudette Rogers Robinson, Ronnie White, Pete Moore and Bobby Rogers
Guitar by Marv Tarplin
Other instrumentation by the Funk Brothers

Syreeta version
Vocals by Syreeta
Instrumentation by Stevie Wonder

Queen Latifah version
Vocals by Queen Latifah
No further information available

External links

References

1962 songs
1963 singles
Motown singles
The Miracles songs
Mary Wells songs
The Temptations songs
Songs written by Smokey Robinson
Songs written by Bobby Rogers